The 19th Toronto International Film Festival (TIFF) took place in Toronto, Ontario, Canada between September 8 and September 17, 1994. Whale Music by Richard J. Lewis was selected as the opening film. The festival's name changed from Festival of festivals to Toronto International Film Festival.

Awards

Programme

Gala Presentation
The Ascent — Donald Shebib
Ashes of Time — Wong Kar-wai
Blue Sky — Tony Richardson
Bullets Over Broadway — Woody Allen
The Burning Season — John Frankenheimer
Captives — Angela Pope
Chungking Express — Wong Kar-wai
Cold Water — Olivier Assayas
Colonel Chabert — Yves Angelo
Eat Drink Man Woman — Ang Lee
Fate (Verhängnis) — Fred Kelemen
I Like It Like That — Darnell Martin
Lamerica — Gianni Amelio
Little Odessa — James Gray
Muriel's Wedding — P. J. Hogan
Nadja — Michael Almereyda
Once Were Warriors — Lee Tamahori
Il Postino: The Postman — Michael Radford
Priest — Antonia Bird
Second Best — Sarah Radclyffe
The Secret of Roan Inish — John Sayles
Sleep with Me — Rory Kelly
The Sum of Us — Kevin Dowling & Geoff Burton
Swimming with Sharks — George Huang 
Through the Olive Trees — Abbas Kiarostami
Vanya on 42nd Street — Louis Malle
Vive L'Amour — Tsai Ming-liang
Whale Music — Richard J. Lewis

Special Presentations
Amateur — Hal Hartley
Curse of the Starving Class — J. Michael McClary
Hell (L'Enfer) — Claude Chabrol
Martha — Rainer Werner Fassbinder
Mrs. Parker and the Vicious Circle — Alan Rudolph
Somebody to Love — Alexandre Rockwell
Three Colors: Red — Krzysztof Kieślowski
To Live — Zhang Yimou
Tsahal — Claude Lanzmann

Spotlight
Anna: 6 - 18 — Nikita Mikhalkov
Burnt by the Sun — Nikita Mikhalkov

Perspective Canada
The Circle Game — Brigitte Berman
Dance Me Outside — Bruce McDonald
Double Happiness — Mina Shum
Eclipse — Jeremy Podeswa
Exotica — Atom Egoyan
Frank's Cock — Mike Hoolboom
Henry & Verlin — Gary Ledbetter
A Hero's Life (La Vie d'un héros) — Micheline Lanctôt
Highway of Heartache — Gregory Wild
Max — Charles Wilkinson
Narmada: A Valley Rises — Ali Kazimi
Only You — Norman Jewison
Paint Cans — Paul Donovan
Picture of Light — Peter Mettler
Super 8½ — Bruce LaBruce
Valentine's Day — Mike Hoolboom
The Wind from Wyoming (Le Vent du Wyoming) — André Forcier
Wasaga — Judith Doyle
Windigo — Robert Morin

Contemporary World Cinema
Dead Tired (Grosse Fatigue) — Michel Blanc
Glitterbug — Derek Jarman
Heavenly Creatures — Peter Jackson
Movie Days — Friðrik Þór Friðriksson
Moving the Mountain — Michael Apted

First Cinema
 Clerks — Kevin Smith
 Coming to Terms with the Dead (Petits arrangements avec les morts) — Pascale Ferran
 Killer — Mark Malone
 Mille Bolle Blu — Leone Pompucci
 The Shawshank Redemption — Frank Darabont
 The Silences of the Palace — Moufida Tlatli

Documentaries
Atlantis — Luc Besson
Hoop Dreams — Steve James
Crumb — Terry Zwigoff
Destiny in Space — Toni Myers
Silent Witness — Harriet Wichin
Tracking Down Maggie — Nick Broomfield

Asian Horizons
 A Borrowed Life — Wu Nien-jen
 The Red Lotus Society — Stan Lai

India Now
 Bandit Queen — Shekhar Kapur
 Fearless: The Hunterwali Story — Riyad Vinci Wadia
 The Kite (Patang) — Goutam Ghose
 Roja — Mani Ratnam

Latin American Panorama
Strawberry and Chocolate — Tomás Gutiérrez Alea & Juan Carlos Tabío

Midnight Madness
Cemetery Man — Michele Soavi
The Eagle Shooting Heroes — Jeffrey Lau
Love and a .45 — C.M. Talkington
Naked Killer — Clarence Fok
Nightwatch — Ole Bornedal
S.F.W. — Jefery Levy
Schramm — Jörg Buttgereit
Tokarefu — Junji Sakamoto
Wes Craven's New Nightmare - Wes Craven

Short Cuts
Leftovers — Janine Fung
Make Some Noise — Andrew Munger
Technilogic Ordering — Philip Hoffman

References

External links
 Official site
 TIFF: A Reel History: 1976 - 2012
1994 Toronto International Film Festival at IMDb

1994
1994 film festivals
1994 in Toronto
1994 in Canadian cinema